Grabówek may refer to the following places:
Grabówek, Gdynia (north Poland)
Grabówek, Lubusz Voivodeship (west Poland)
Grabówek, Masovian Voivodeship (east-central Poland)
Grabówek, Podlaskie Voivodeship (north-east Poland)
Grabówek, Warmian-Masurian Voivodeship (north Poland)